Keleti pályaudvar (Keleti Railway Station) is a transfer station on M2 and M4 lines of the Budapest Metro. The Line M2 station was open on 2 April 1970 as part of the inaugural section of Line M2, between Deák Ferenc tér and Örs vezér tere. The Line M4 station was opened on 28 March 2014 as the eastern terminus of the inaugural section of the line, from Keleti pályaudvar to Kelenföld vasútállomás.

Connections
Bus: 5, 7, 7E, 8E, 20E, 30, 30A, 107, 108E, 110, 112, 133E, 230
Trolleybus: 73, 76, 78, 79M, 80
Tram: 2M, 24

References

Notes

Sources
Budapest City Atlas, Szarvas-Dimap, Budapest, 2011, 
Official web page of the Line 4 construction

M2 (Budapest Metro) stations
M4 (Budapest Metro) stations
Railway stations opened in 1970
Railway stations opened in 2014
1970 establishments in Hungary